The Auto Care Association is a not-for-profit trade association based in Bethesda, Maryland. Auto Care Association's nearly 3,000 members and affiliate companies, represent approximately 150,000 businesses that manufacture, distribute, sell and install motor vehicle parts, accessories, tools, equipment, materials, supplies, and services. Representing suppliers, distributors, retailers, service providers, program groups, manufacturers’ representatives, educators, and publishers, the Auto Care Association protects and advances the interests of businesses providing aftermarket products and services for all classes of motor vehicles.

The Auto Care Association's government affairs department represents the industry's complex set of interests before federal and state legislators and regulators, and advocates for policies that are favorable to member businesses, while their market intelligence experts assess trends that are reshaping the industry. Their international program assists members seeking opportunities in the lucrative global market.

History 
Formerly known as the Automotive Aftermarket Industry Association (AAIA), the organization was established in July 1999 upon the consolidation of the Automotive Parts and Accessories Association (APAA) and the Automotive Service Industry Association (ASIA). Their name was changed to Auto Care Association in 2014. Bill Hanvey currently leads Auto Care Association as president and CEO. The association’s board of directors consists of 13 members, as of 2022.

Communities 
The Auto Care Association works as an umbrella organization serving corners of the auto care industry through its professional communities and groups. These include the Automotive Warehouse Distributors Association (AWDA), the Car Care Professionals Network (CCPN), the Filter Manufacturers Community (FMC), the Heavy Duty Distribution Association (HDDA), the Import Vehicle Community, the Manufacturers’ Representatives, the Paint, Body & Equipment Specialists (PBES), Tool & Equipment, and the Upholstery & Trim International (Trim), communities.

In addition, the Auto Care Association supports secondary communities that enhances the individual development of members from primary communities. The secondary communities include the Automotive Content Professionals Network (ACPN), Women in Auto Care, and the Young Auto Care Network Group (YANG).

Events 
Auto Care Association is a co-owner of the Automotive Aftermarket Products Expo (AAPEX), the largest annual trade show for automotive aftermarket industry professionals. The AAPEX show is part of the Automotive Aftermarket Industry Week held during the first week of November at the Sands Expo Center in Las Vegas, Nevada. Nearly 162,000 professionals from around the globe participate in Automotive Aftermarket Industry Week (AAIW).

Co-owned by the Auto Care Association and the Automotive Aftermarket Suppliers Association (AASA), the light vehicle aftermarket division of the Motor & Equipment Manufacturers Association (MEMA), AAPEX represents the $740 billion global automotive aftermarket industry. It features more than 2,500 exhibiting companies, 5,500 booths, 50 AAPEXedu sessions and approximately 47,000 targeted buyers.

In addition to AAPEX, the Auto Care Association hosts a number of additional events throughout the calendar year including the: Women in Auto Care Summer and Winter Conferences, ACPN Knowledge Exchange, Auto Care Association Spring Leadership Days, YANG Leadership Conference, PBES Annual Conference, Auto Care Association Fall Leadership Days, Upholstery and Trim International Council Convention, the AWDA Conference, and is also a co-owner of HDAW: Heavy Duty Aftermarket Week.

Heavy Duty Aftermarket Week (HDAW) is the largest North American gathering of the independent heavy-duty industry. More than 2,300 executives and managers from the U.S., Canada and six other countries including distributors, suppliers, service providers, educators and industry media attended the 2018 conference in Las Vegas.

Publications 
Notable market research publications include the Auto Care Factbook, Auto Care Factbook & Lang Annual, Collision Repair Trends Report, China Market Report, Mexico Market Report, Tool and Equipment, Auto Care Insider, and the State of Auto Care.

See also
aftermarket (automotive)
Motor Vehicle Owners' Right to Repair Act
Trade fair
Auto mechanic
Lauren Fix is the spokesperson for the Be Car Care Aware Program

References

 https://www.autocare.org/
 https://www.aapexshow.com/

Automobile associations in the United States
Companies based in Bethesda, Maryland
Motor trade associations
Non-profit organizations based in Maryland
Organizations established in 1999
1999 establishments in Maryland